Domine Banyankimbona (born in 1970) is serving as the Minister of Public Service, Labour and Employment in the Republic of Burundi.

Background and education 
Banyankimbona was born in 1970 in Bururi Province. She is a member of the Catholic Church. Banyankimbona received a Bachelor’s Degree in Law from Hope University, Nairobi.

Career 
Banyankimbona served as the Vice President of one of the Supreme Court in Burundi and later became President and at the Court of Cassation. Thereafter, she became President of the First Section of the Judicial Chamber. Banyankimbona occupied various positions relating to her profession before she became the Minister of Public Service, Labour and Employment appointed by the President of Burundi, Evariste Ndayimiyishe.

References 

1970 births
Living people
Burundian politicians
Government ministers of Burundi
Members of the Parliament of Burundi
Women government ministers of Burundi
People from Bururi Province